Complaints and Grievances is the 17th album and twelfth HBO stand-up special by comedian George Carlin. Its working title was I Kinda Like It When a Lot of People Die, but it was renamed following the September 11, 2001 attacks. Another possible title was The Great American Cattle Drive, according to Carlin during an interview with Coast to Coast AM in 1999.

Complaints and Grievances was nominated for the 2003 Grammy Award for Best Spoken Comedy Album.

Production
The working title of the show was "I Kinda Like It When A Lot of People Die" but it was changed after the September 11 2001 attacks. In an interview with Opie & Anthony on October 24, 2001, Carlin explained: "It's gonna be good, though. It's a strong show. I had to make a few alterations 'cause–You wanna hear the name of what the show was called and I'm telling you the truth? [...] The name of it was I Kinda Like It When A Lot of People Die. Yeah. And it was all about natural disasters and stuff and I had a nice nine minute piece on that but the morning I woke up and saw the special effects thing on the TV I thought 'Oh yeah. Oh. Change. Changing the name.'" After explaining briefly the nature of the show, Carlin added "Everything's the same, except I had to take that piece out. I just knew... no-one would laugh. You know. Obviously." The unaltered opening to the program was later discovered by his daughter, after his death.

Legacy
The title track of the working version of this show was released on the official 2016 release I Kinda Like It When a Lotta People Die. The material had been performed on September 10, 2001 and was released alongside the first performance of the routine which shows a marked contrast in the writing of the routine.

Track listing
All tracks by George Carlin.

"The Opening" - 9:22
"Traffic Accidents: Keep Movin'!" - 6:16
"You and Me (Things That Come Off of Your Body)" - 10:38
"People Who Oughta Be Killed: Self-Help Books" - 1:16
"Motivation Seminars" - 1:05
"Parents of Honor Students" - 2:15
"Baby Slings" - 0:59
"My Daddy" - 0:51
"Telephone Mimes" - 1:09
"Hands-Free Telephone Headsets" - 0:38
"Answering Machines" - 0:52
"Family Newsletters" - 1:23
"Music on Answering Machines" - 1:39
"People Who Wear Visors" - 0:39
"Singers with One Name" - 0:41
"Rich Guys in Hot Air Balloons" - 1:01
"People Who Misuse Credit Cards" - 0:51
"Guys Named Todd" - 1:30
"Gun Enthusiasts" - 1:26
"White Guys Who Shave Their Heads" - 0:48
"NASA-Holes" - 1:32
"Why We Don't Need 10 Commandments" - 7:14

Personnel
George Carlin - production
Greg Calbi - editing, mastering
Terry Kulchar - location sound
Winston Smith - illustrations

References

External links
George Carlin's official website

2000s American television specials
HBO network specials
Stand-up comedy concert films
George Carlin live albums
Stand-up comedy albums
Spoken word albums by American artists
Live spoken word albums
2001 live albums
Atlantic Records live albums
Eardrum Records live albums
2001 television specials
2000s comedy albums